Richard Wilson may refer to:

Academia 
 Richard Wilson (scholar) (born 1950), British Shakespeare scholar
 Richard Wilson (physicist) (1926–2018), British born American physicist
 Richard Guy Wilson (born 1940), architectural historian and University of Virginia faculty member
 Richard K. Wilson (born 1959), American professor of genetics and molecular microbiology
 Richard L. Wilson (1905–1981), American journalist
 Richard F. Wilson, president of Illinois Wesleyan University
 R. M. Wilson (born 1945), American mathematician (combinatorics), professor at Caltech
 Richard Ashby Wilson, American-British social anthropologist

Arts and music 
 Richard Wilson (sculptor) (born 1953), British sculptor and musician
 Richard Wilson (author) (1920–1987), American science-fiction writer
 Rich Wilson (journalist), contemporary UK based freelance rock writer
 Richard Edward Wilson (born 1941), American composer
 Richard Wilson (painter) (1714–1782), Welsh landscape painter

Businessmen 
 Richard Thornton Wilson Jr. (1866–1929), American businessman and prominent figure in horse racing
 Richard Wilson (businessman) Australian businessman, notable managing director for Melbourne Victory
 Richard Wilson (born 1968) UK businessman, CEO of TIGA
 Richard Thornton Wilson (1829–1910), American investment banker

Film and television 
 Richard Wilson (Australian actor) (born 1984), British-born Australian actor
 Richard Wilson (director) (1915–1991), American director and producer involved with Orson Welles' Mercury Theatre and other Hollywood films
 Richard Wilson (Scottish actor) (born 1936), British actor who played the character Victor Meldrew in the sitcom One Foot in the Grave

Military 
 Richard G. Wilson (1931–1950), American soldier and Medal of Honor recipient
 Richard Wilson (general) (born 1955), Australian general

Politics 
 Richard Wilson, Baron Wilson of Dinton (born 1942), member of the British House of Lords and former Cabinet secretary
 Richard Wilson (Irish politician) (died 1957), Irish Farmers' Party politician, 1922–1936
 Richard Wilson (Barnstaple MP) (c. 1750–1815), Member of Parliament for Barnstaple, 1796–1802
 Richard Wilson (Ipswich MP) (1759–1834), Member of Parliament for Ipswich, 1806–1807
 Richard B. Wilson (1904–1991), Mayor of Victoria, British Columbia, Canada, 1961–1965
 Rick Wilson (Australian politician) (born 1966), member of the Australian House of Representatives
 Rick Wilson (Canadian politician) (born 1950s), member of the Legislative Assembly of Alberta
 Rick Wilson, candidate in the United States House of Representatives elections in Michigan, 2010
 Rick Wilson (political consultant) (born 1963), American Republican political strategist and media consultant known as one of the co-founders of The Lincoln Project

Sports 
 Rick Wilson (basketball) (born 1956), basketball player
 Richard Wilson (cricketer) (born 1869), Australian cricketer
 Richard Wilson (footballer, born 1956), New Zealand football goalkeeper
 Richard Wilson (footballer, born 1960), English football player
 Rick Wilson (racing driver) (born 1953), NASCAR driver
 Rick Wilson (ice hockey) (born 1950), ice hockey player
 Rick Wilson (jockey) (born 1953), American jockey
 Rick Wilson (wrestler) (1965–1999), American professional wrestler best known as "the Renegade" in World Championship Wrestling
 Richard Wilson (rugby union) (born 1953), New Zealand rugby union player
 Richard  Wilson (sailor) (born 1950), Round the World Sailor

See also
 Dick Wilson (disambiguation)
 Ricky Wilson (disambiguation)